Belenois aurota, the pioneer or pioneer white or caper white, is a small to medium-sized butterfly of the family Pieridae, that is, the yellows and whites, which is found in South Asia and Africa. In Africa, it is also known as the brown-veined white, and is well known during summer and autumn when large numbers migrate north-east over the interior.

Description

Wet-season form
The upperside of males is white with the forewing having the costa from base to base of vein 11 dusky black and then jet black continuing into a widened and curving short streak along the discocellulars to the lower apex of the cell; apical area diagonally with the termen black, the former with six elongate outwardly pointed spots of the ground colour enclosed one in each of the interspaces 3, 4, 5, 6, 8, and 9. Hindwing: uniform, the black along the venation on the underside seen through by transparency; termen between veins 2 and 6 somewhat broadly black, with a series of four round spots of the ground colour in the interspaces; below vein 2 and above vein 6 the termen is very narrowly black. Underside: forewing white, markings similar, more clearly defined, the white spots within the black apical area larger. Hindwing: yellowish white, all the veins very broadly bordered with black; interspaces 1, 2, 6, and 7 with crossbars of black, beyond which there is a subterminal, somewhat broad, transverse band of black between veins 2 and 6. Cilia of both forewings and hindwings white alternated with black. The ground colour on both upper and undersides variable, often cream coloured above; beneath: in some specimens, the base of cell and the elongate spots in apical area of forewing, and the whole surface of the hindwing varies to rich chrome yellow.

Female similar; the black markings on both upper and undersides broader, the white spots on black apical area of forewing often sub-obsolete above.

Antennae in both sexes black, sparsely sprinkled with white dots; head, thorax and abdomen above and below white: thorax above often bluish grey.

Dry-season form
The dry-season form is similar to the wet-season form but on the upperside the black markings are narrower, the white markings on the black apical area of forewing broader and longer, and on the hindwing the narrow inner margining to the black on the termen very narrow, somewhat obsolescent; therefore, the white subterminal spots have the appearance of opening inwards. Underside: ground colour almost pure white; on the hindwing slightly tinged with yellow. Antennae, head, thorax, and abdomen as in the wet-season form.

Wingspan of 44–62 mm.

Race taprobana, Moore (Sri Lanka) differs from the typical form as follows: Male upperside, forewing: deep black on apical area, the enclosed white elongate spots more or less obsolete. Hindwing: the black terminal border much broader and of a deeper black, the enclosed white spots, except the spot in interspace 6, very much smaller, somewhat obsolescent, sometimes absent in interspace 4. Underside: similar to the upperside, the markings of a very intense black and broader, the enclosed spots in the apical area of forewing, the white of the cell and the area along the upper half of the wing generally overlaid with rich chrome yellow. Hindwing: ground colour a deep rich chrome yellow, the spots on it enclosed in the black along terminal margin subhastate (somewhat spear shaped), the spot in interspace 4 absent.

The female is similar to the male on both upper and undersides, but in most specimens, on the upperside, the spots of the white ground colour that are enclosed in the black apical area of the forewing and the spots on the black border along the terminal margin of the hindwing are entirely absent.

Distribution

The species lives in Sri Lanka, the Himalayas from Kashmir to Sikkim at elevations below , and through the plains to southern India. To the west it spreads through Persia and Arabia to East Africa. The species occurs over the greater part of Sub-Saharan Africa.

Life cycle
Food plants of the larvae include Capparis zeylanica. In Africa, the host plants are almost exclusively from the family Capparaceae and in particular the genera Boscia, Maerua and Capparis. Eggs are laid in batches of 20 or so, while the newly hatched larvae are gregarious.

Larva

Pupa

See also 
 List of butterflies of India (Pieridae)

Notes

References 
 
 

Pierini
Butterflies of Asia
Butterflies of Africa
Butterflies described in 1793
Taxa named by Johan Christian Fabricius